Dolnja Počehova ( or ) is a settlement in the Municipality of Pesnica in northeastern Slovenia. It lies in the Upper Pesnica Valley. The area is part of the traditional region of Styria. It is now included in the Drava Statistical Region.

A small roadside chapel-shrine in the settlement dates to 1775.

References

External links
Dolnja Počehova on Geopedia

Populated places in the Municipality of Pesnica